Yehia or Yehya is a given name and surname. Notable people with the name include:

Yehia Chahine (1917–1994), Egyptian film producer and an actor of film and theater
Yehia El-Fakharany (born 1945), Egyptian actor
Yehia El-Mashad (1932–1980), Egyptian atomic scientist assassinated in Paris
Yehia Hakki (1905–1992), one of the pioneers of the modern literary movement in Egypt
Mohamed Yehia Zakaria (born 1938), pioneer of the beverage industry in the Arab world, co-founder of Pepsi-Cola Dubai (Dubai Refreshments)
Tarek Yehia (born 1961), Egyptian football player

See also
Yahia
Yahya (name)
Yahya
Yihyah